Chakan may refer to:
Chakan, Maharashtra a census town in Pune district in the state of Maharashtra, India
Chakan Fort, Pune
Chakan, Iran (disambiguation), places in Iran
Chakan, Maragheh, a village in East Azerbaijan Province, Iran
Chakan, Lorestan, a village in Iran
Chakan, Jalal-Abad, a village in Kyrgyzstan
Chakan (Maya province), a Maya region that existed upon the arrival of the Spanish conquerors in the Yucatán Peninsula in the 16th century
Chakan: The Forever Man, a 1992 video game